CloudKit is an integrated macOS and iOS API that functions as a backend as a service (BaaS).  CloudKit is the framework that powers iCloud on iOS, macOS and on the web.

Services 
Application developers can utilize CloudKit for integrated access to Apple's iCloud servers into iOS and macOS applications. The framework provides authentication, a private database, a public database and structured asset storage services allowing developers to focus on client-side development. It is the foundation for both iCloud Storage and iCloud Photo Library.

CloudKit also offers several APIs to access the iCloud Storage, where a user can store data and files so that they can be easily accessible from other devices.

Reception 
Developers claim that this framework "replaces back-end web services like old-school databases, file storage and user authentication systems."

See also

 Mobile Backend as a Service
 Parse (company)

References

Apple Inc. services
Cloud infrastructure
Application programming interfaces
Software frameworks